KVGQ (106.9 FM, "106.9 Da Bomb") is a radio station licensed to Overton, Nevada, United States. Owned by Kemp Communications, it broadcasts a classic hits format focusing upon music from the 1990s and 2000s. Its studios are located on the south end of the Las Vegas Strip, while its transmitter site is near Moapa Valley.

This station's programming is also simulcast on KEMP (99.3 FM) in Payson, Arizona. That station claims to broadcast to the Phoenix radio market, although there is a translator station on 99.3 in Phoenix, blocking KEMP within city limits.  KEMP is powered at 17,000 watts and covers a region northeast of Phoenix and southeast of Flagstaff, Arizona.

As part of its original format before June 24, 2013, the station broadcast a lot of seldom heard pop and rock songs, especially in the United States.

In 2017, the station tweaked its format from hot AC to adult CHR by having a more current-intensive playlist.

On October 2, 2020, KVGQ flipped to 1990s/2000s hits branded as "106.9 Da Bomb", competing against KXQQ-FM.

Booster station
KVGQ programming is also carried by a booster station to extend or improve the coverage area of the station.

Previous logo

References

External links
KVGQ official website

VGQ
Radio stations established in 2009
Clark County, Nevada
2009 establishments in Nevada
Classic hits radio stations in the United States